Indrek Raudne (born 18 December 1975 in Tallinn) is an Estonian entrepreneur and politician. He has been member of X and XII Riigikogu.

He is a member of party Pro Patria and Res Publica Union (nowadays party Isamaa).

References

1975 births
Living people
Estonian businesspeople
Pro Patria Union politicians
Res Publica Party politicians
Members of the Riigikogu, 2003–2007
University of Tartu alumni
Politicians from Tallinn
Members of the Riigikogu, 2011–2015